Epistle to the English was a 1526 book by John Bugenhagen, a close friend of Martin Luther. It was written to encourage English reformers.

References

1526 books